Muhovac is a village located in the municipality of Bujanovac, Serbia. According to the 2002 census, the town has a population of 570 people. Of these, 567 (99,47 %) were ethnic Albanians, 2 (0,35 %) were Bosniaks and 1 (0,17 %) other.

References

Populated places in Pčinja District
Albanian communities in Serbia